Paul Thompson (born 1935) is a British sociologist and oral historian. Prior to his recent retirement, he held the position of Research Professor of Sociology at the University of Essex. Thompson is regarded as a pioneer in social science research, particularly due to the development of life stories and oral history within sociology and social history.

Academic career
Thompson was educated at the University of Oxford, graduating in 1958 with First Class Honours in modern history. He obtained a D.Phil. (also at the University of Oxford) in 1964. This was entitled London Working Class Politics and the Formation of the London Labour Party, 1885-1914. In 1964, having spent three years as a Junior Research Fellow at Queen's College, Oxford, Thompson was appointed Lecturer in Sociology (Social History) at the newly established University of Essex. He was to continue his research and teaching in sociology and social history at Essex, being appointed Research Professor in Sociology, in 1988.

Between 1994 and 2001, Thompson was also the Director of ESDS Qualidata, University of Essex, where he actively pursued his interest in the preservation of qualitative research materials for secondary use. In doing so, he deposited most his own datasets there while at the same time he was actively involved in the development of this archival service.

Oral History
Thompson is regarded as one of the pioneers of oral history as a research methodology in the social sciences. In 1971 he founded the Oral History Society and the journal Oral History. Between 1970 and 1973 he carried out a project titled 'Family Life and Work Experience before 1918' which was the first national oral history interview study to be carried out in Britain. The project resulted in a number of publications, including Thompson's The Edwardians: The Remaking of British Society, which was published in 1975 and again in revised form in 1992.

In 1987 he also founded the National Life Story Collection (now known as National Life Stories) at the British Library National Sound Archive in London. The aim of this new collection was to "record first-hand experiences of as wide a cross-section of present-day society as possible".

Subsequent oral history work includes studies of the family and community life of Scottish fishermen as well as car workers in Coventry and Turin. Recently, Thompson carried out a research project aimed at recording life stories with trans-national Jamaican families and is currently expanding on his work with pioneers of social research.

Selected publications
Architecture: art or social service, London: Fabian Society, 1963
With Kidson, P. and Murray, P. A history of English architecture, Harmondsworth: Penguin Books, 1965
Socialists, Liberals and Labour: the struggle for London 1885-1914, London: Routledge, Kegan Paul and University of Toronto Press, 1967
The work of William Morris, New York: William Heinemann and Viking Press, 1967
William Butterfield, Routledge & Kegan Paul, London, 1971, 
The Edwardians: the remaking of British society, London: Weidenfeld and Nicolson, 1975
The voice of the past: oral history, Oxford: Oxford University Press, 1978
With Burchardt, N. (eds.) Our common history: the transformation of Europe, London: Pluto Press, 1982
Living the fishing, London, Boston: Routledge and Kegan Paul, 1983
With Itzin, C. and Abendstern, M. I don't feel old: the experience of later life, Oxford: Oxford University Press, 1990
With Samuel, R. (eds.) The myths we live by, London: Routledge, 1990
With et al. Listening for a change: oral testimony and development, London: Panos Publications, 1993
With Bertaux, D. (eds.) Between generations: family models, myths and memories, Oxford: Oxford University Press, 1993
With Passerini, L. and Leydesdorff, S. (eds.) Gender and memory, Oxford: Oxford University, 1996
With Bertaux, D. Pathways to social class: a qualitative approach to social mobility, Oxford: Clarendon Press, 1996
With Courtney, C. City lives: the changing voices of British finance, London: Methuen, 1996
With et al. Growing up in stepfamilies, USA: Oxford University Press, 1997
With Chamberlain, M. (eds.) Narrative and genre: contexts and types of communication, London: Routledge, 1998
With Hussey, S. (eds.) Environmental consciousness: the roots of a new political agenda, New York: Transaction, 2004
With Bertaux, D. and Rotkirch, A. (eds.) On living through Soviet Russia, London: Routledge, 2004
With Bauer, E. Jamaican hands across the Atlantic, Kingston, Jamaica: Ian Randle, 2006
With Corti, B. Sea-change: Wivenhoe remembered, Stoud: Tempus, 2006

References

External links
Paul Thompson at "Pioneers of Qualitative Research" from the Economic and Social Data Service
National Life Stories

Living people
British historians
1935 births
British sociologists